Lise-Marie Henzelin (born ) is a Swiss female  cyclo-cross cyclist. She represented her nation in the women's elite event at the 2016 UCI Cyclo-cross World Championships  in Heusden-Zolder.

References

External links
 Profile at cyclingarchives.com

1991 births
Living people
Cyclo-cross cyclists
Swiss female cyclists
Place of birth missing (living people)